Pierre Maudet (born 6 March 1978) is a Swiss and French politician. Maudet was a member of FDP.The Liberals. He was the mayor of Geneva from 1 June 2011 to 31 May 2012.

Biography
Pierre Maudet is the son of Henri Maudet (born 1948), a Frenchman who first studied theology in Paris before moving to Geneva, Switzerland and becoming a lawyer, and Susanna Willy (born 1943), a teacher. Maudet was born on 6 March 1978 in Geneva and attended the University of Fribourg.

On 17 June 2012, he was elected to the Council of State of Geneva, the executive council of the Canton of Geneva with 40,966 votes out of 104,375 cast.

In 2017, he was nominated by his party to run for the Federal Council. He lost the election in the second ballot receiving 90 votes against Ignazio Cassis who received 125 votes and therefore achieved the absolute majority. The election took place on 20 September 2017.

In 2018, he writes a regular column in the German-speaking newspaper Blick.

Controversial 2015 expenses-paid trip to Abu Dhabi 
In November 2015, Pierre Maudet and his family, his former chief of staff Patrick Baud-Lavigne and Antoine Daher, a friend active in real estate in Geneva, made a luxury trip to Abu Dhabi. Pierre Maudet initially claimed until May 2018 that the trip, including business class flights, accommodation at the Emirates Palace and access to the Formula One race was a private trip, paid for by his friend and it was by chance that he met Sheikh Mohammed bin Zayed Al Nahyan, Crown Prince of Abu Dhabi. Following this meeting, he held talks with senior officials on political issues.

A police report on the trip was submitted to the courts in August 2017, and proceedings were opened against an unknown person, Pierre Maudet and his chief of staff.

In August 2018, the public prosecutor claims Pierre Maudet accepted flights and accommodation for an amount estimated at several tens of thousands of Swiss francs.

While denying a conflict of interest, Pierre Maudet then admitted “having hidden part of the truth”.

In September 2018, the Council of State of Geneva decided to temporarily withdraw the Presidential Department from Pierre Maudet, now entrusted to Antonio Hodgers.

On 23 November 2018, an online petition on change.org was launched urging Maudet to resign and Pierre Maudet was criticized by Swiss Liberal Party president Petra Gössi, who stated: "If I were Pierre Maudet, I would have already resigned".

In July 2020, Swiss FDP committee voted 22 for-1 opposed-1 abstention for expulsion of M. Pierre Maudet from Swiss FDP party for ethics violations regarding his acceptance and inaccurate reporting regarding Dubai travel and acceptance of related gratuities. On 29 October 2020 he announced his resignation from his government position, adding that he would run again in the subsequent March 2021 election. He was found guilty of accepting illegal advantages on 22 February 2021 and given a suspended 300 day-fine sentence. Maudet then lost his bid for re-election to the Geneva Cantonal government in a run-off to Green candidate Fabienne Fischer. He nevertheless indicated his intention to remain politically active. On 3 May 2021 a local cybersecurity company announced his hiring.

See also
 Politics of Switzerland

Books 
 Philippe Reichen: Pierre Maudet − sein Fall. Stämpfli, Bern 2019, .

References

External links 
 Pierre Maudet — ville-geneve.ch
 Pierre Maudet's Blog

1978 births
FDP.The Liberals politicians
Living people
Mayors of Geneva
University of Fribourg alumni